NASA Parkway, also known as NASA Causeway, is an east–west expressway in Brevard County, Florida, containing two causeways. The first causeway connects the Florida mainland to Merritt Island and later, over the private second causeway, connects Merritt Island to Cape Canaveral. As such, the NASA Parkway is the main route connecting points of interest in Titusville, Florida to the Kennedy Space Center on Merritt Island.

Route description

First causeway 
The first causeway begins on the mainland when Columbia Boulevard crosses U.S. Route 1 in Titusville and experiences a name change. This is also the terminus of State Road 405. Continuing eastward, NASA Causeway crosses the Indian River Lagoon. A bascule bridge permits boats on the Intracoastal Waterway to pass through the causeway.

NASA Parkway West 
About  in, the road reaches an intersection with Space Commerce Way. The majority of traffic on NASA Parkway turns here, as the main entrance to the Kennedy Space Center is located down this road.

East of Space Commerce Way, the Parkway passes the former main gate of the Kennedy Space Center Visitor Complex. The general public is not permitted beyond this point. Immediately east of the gate, the Parkway contains a diamond interchange with Courtenay Parkway, the division line between the western and eastern portions of the Parkway.

Tour buses access the Vehicle Assembly Building, the Saturn V Center and the Space Shuttle landing strip by journeying north from this point on Kennedy Parkway.

NASA Parkway East 
The eastern section of the NASA Parkway begins at its intersection with Courtenay Parkway in the former town of Orsino, Florida. Traveling east, it passes an area of support buildings and offices. At the end of this area, it reduces from four lanes to two and crosses the Banana River as a two-lane causeway with a bascule bridge.

Second causeway 
The causeway over the Banana River is less known than the first causeway, as it is not accessible to the general public. The main use of the causeway is for military personnel to access the mainland, as the route leads from Merritt Island to Cape Canaveral Space Force Station.

The NASA Parkway designation ends shortly after the NASA Causeway's eastern end, where the parkway terminates at the Samuel C Philips Parkway. From this point, authorized users can access the point of Cape Canaveral via Central Control Road. The Cape Canaveral Light is visible, and, via Lighthouse Road, authorized users can access Launch Complex 46.

Alternatives 
While the NASA Parkway is the principal access route for tourists from Titusville and points west (such as Orlando, Florida), visitors from points to the south, such as Cocoa Beach, Florida need not to use NASA Parkway West to cross the Indian River.  Instead, they may approach the Kennedy Space Center from the south on Florida State Route 3, which terminates at the Kennedy Space Center property line. Diverted by a security gate, the general public must make a left on Space Commerce Way and directly access the Visitor Complex from the main gate.

Notes

References 

Causeways in Florida
Bridges in Brevard County, Florida
Bridges over the Indian River (Florida)
Indian River Lagoon
Kennedy Space Center
Road bridges in Florida
Roads in Brevard County, Florida
Bascule bridges in the United States